Boonie Bears: Entangled Worlds (known as Fantastica: A Boonie Bears Adventure in the English dub) is a 2017 Chinese animated comedy film. An English dub was released on DirectTV on 16 May 2019, featuring the voices of Josh Peck and Mario Lopez as the Boonie Bears.

Plot

The story revolves around a character who has been marginalised for years, and therefore creates portals to fantasy worlds to try and defeat lord Boros with the help of Sumido and Rothanank

Characters

Vick

Briar

Bramble

Koko

Cast 

Laure Shang
Bao Chunlai
Sun Jianhong
Joseph Zeng
Bingjun Zhang

Reception
The film grossed  in previews on 14 and 15 January 2017.

References

External links
 

Chinese animated films
2010s children's comedy films
Animated comedy films
Chinese children's films
Le Vision Pictures films
2017 computer-animated films
Animated films based on animated series
2017 films
2017 comedy films
Films about parallel universes
Boonie Bears films
2010s Mandarin-language films